Philip H. Melanson (1944 – September 18, 2006) was a Chancellor Professor of Policy Studies at University of Massachusetts Dartmouth and served on the Executive Board of the university's  Center for Policy Analysis (CFPA) now known as the Public Policy Center.  He  served as chair of the Political Science Department for 12 years.

He also served as coordinator of the Robert F. Kennedy Assassination Archive from April 1988, which is the world's largest collection on the subject.

An internationally recognized expert on political violence and governmental secrecy, Melanson wrote numerous books and articles related to these subjects. He was also member of the governing board of John Judge's Coalition on Political Assassinations. He appeared on BBC, CBS, CNN, C-SPAN, and NPR news programs.

In 2001 he was the University of Massachusetts, Dartmouth Faculty Federation Scholar of the Year.

He made numerous Freedom of Information Act (FOIA) requests, which resulted in the release of over 200,000 pages of federal government documents on topics relevant to his research.

The Philip H. Melanson Memorial Scholarship was established in 2006 by friends, colleagues, and former students of Dr. Melanson to provide financial assistance to graduate students who are enrolled at UMass Dartmouth and maintain an active interest in public policy.

Publications
Knowledge, Politics, and Public Policy (ed.). Cambridge, Mass.: Winthrop Publishers Inc. (1973).
Political Science and Political Knowledge. Washington, D.C.: Public Affairs Press (1975).
The Politics of Protection: The U.S. Secret Service in The Terrorist Age. New York: Praeger Publishers (1984).
The MURKIN Conspiracy: An Inquiry into the Assassination of Dr. Martin Luther King, Jr. New York: Praeger Publishers (1988). .
Spy Saga: Lee Harvey Oswald and U.S. Intelligence.  New York: Prager (1990). .
The Robert F. Kennedy Assassination: New Revelations on the Conspiracy and Coverup, 1968–1991. New York: Shapolsky Publishers (1991).
The Assassination of Martin Luther King, Jr. New York: SPI Books (1991).
Who Killed Martin Luther King? Berkeley, Calif.: Odonian Press (1991).
Who Killed Robert Kennedy? Berkeley, Calif.: Odonian Press (1991).
Shadow Play: The Killing of Robert Kennedy, The Trial of Sirhan Sirhan, and the Failure of American Justice, with William Klaber. New York: St. Martin's Press (1997). .
Secrecy Wars: Privacy, National Security and the Public's Right to Know. Dulles, Virg.: Brassey's (Jan. 2002). .
The Secret Service: The Hidden History of an Enigmatic Agency, with Peter Stevens. New York: Carroll & Graff (2002). .

Notes and references

External links
 Appearances on C-SPAN
 Philip Melanson at IMDb
 Files at the Weisberg Collection
 Philip Melanson (mirrored via Internet Archive)
 Phillip Melanson (filed under misspelled name)
 CIA-Zapruder film article
 The MURKIN Conspiracy
 Robert F. Kennedy assassination
 Spy Saga and commentary

1944 births
2006 deaths
20th-century American educators
American male non-fiction writers
American political writers
University of Massachusetts Dartmouth faculty
20th-century American male writers